Veli Paloheimo (born 13 December 1967) is a former professional tennis player from Finland.

Career
The right-hander reached his highest individual ranking on the ATP Tour on 1 October 1990, reaching World number 48. His best performance at a Grand Slam came at the 1990 Australian Open, where he made the fourth round.

Paloheimo participated in 12 Davis Cup ties for Finland from 1986–1992, posting an 11–11 record in singles and a 4–5 record in doubles.

He decided to finish his sports career early in order to become a Jehovah's Witness.

His father is Finnish and his mother is German. He was born in Finland.

Challenger finals

Singles (3-0)

See also
List of Finland Davis Cup team representatives

References

External links
 
 
 

1967 births
Converts to Jehovah's Witnesses
Finnish Jehovah's Witnesses
Finnish male tennis players
Living people
Sportspeople from Tampere